Reigate and Banstead is a local government district with borough status in east Surrey, England. It includes the towns of Reigate, Redhill, Horley and Banstead. The borough borders the Borough of Crawley (in West Sussex) to the south, the Borough of Epsom and Ewell and District of Mole Valley to the west, Tandridge District to the east and the London Boroughs of Sutton and Croydon to the north.

History of Local Authority and Politics
The district was formed on 1 April 1974, under the Local Government Act 1972, by a merger of the Municipal Borough of Reigate with Banstead Urban District and part of Dorking and Horley Rural District. There are two civil parishes towards the south the borough: Salfords and Sidlow and Horley. The remainder of the area has two rather than three tiers of local government; the next tier up is Surrey County Council.

Local Politics

The 2019 election saw the Conservatives hold control of the council, with a significantly reduced majority.

Administration (29):
Conservatives – 29 seats

Opposition (16): 
Green Party – 6 seats
Liberal Democrats – 3 seats
Tattenham Corner and Preston Residents Association – 3 seats 
Nork Residents Association – 2 seats
Independent – 1 seat
Reigate Residents Association – 1 seat

The 2021 election saw the Green Party gain a seat from the Conservatives.
The 2022 election saw the Green Party gain 2 seats from the Conservatives, but the conservatives gain a seat from an independent.

Coat of arms
The coat of arms is a combination of the elements of the Reigate shield, the device of Banstead and symbols of the parishes of Horley and Salfords and Sidlow.

The shield has a background of blue and yellow chequers taken from the arms of the de Warenne family. William de Warenne accompanied William the Conqueror from Normandy and was the first Earl of Surrey and the builder of Reigate Castle. Against this pattern is the Reigate Castle Gate and oak tree.

The top of the shield has a black background as in the original Reigate arms but on which is a gold woolpack between two sprigs of oak. The woolpack or woolsack refers to the former importance of sheep rearing and wool production in Banstead. The oak sprigs represent the two parishes of Horley and Salfords and Sidlow.

Above the shield is a helmet with a wreath and draped cloth also in the blue and gold of the de Warennes. On top of the helmet is a pilgrim referring to the ancient route along the escarpment of the North Downs by Banstead and Reigate, the Pilgrims Way.

On either side of the shield is a white lion and a white horse. The lion comes from the arms of the de Mowbray family who were briefly Lords of the Manor of Banstead in the 12th century. The horse refers to the tradition of horse racing on Banstead Downs in the 17th century and immortalised in the Oaks race of Epsom Derby Friday. On the necks of the animals are wreaths again in the blue and yellow. On the shoulders are roundels of blue and white waves indicating the River Mole in Horley and Sidlow.

The roundel on the lion has a tanner's (or flaying) knife, the emblem of St Bartholomew, the patron of Horley, who is said to have been flayed or skinned before he was crucified. The roundel on the shoulder of the horse has a sallow leaf, a reference to Salfords, which is derived from Sallow Ford. The Sallow tree is commonly known as Pussy Willow.

The motto "Never Wonne ne never shall" is taken from an ancient couplet and refers to the defeat of the Danes by King Alfred in a battle in the Vale of Holmesdale in the 9th century, now remembered in the name Battlebridge. Reigate Castle has also been known as Holmesdale Castle. A translation is "Never conquered nor never shall".

Settlements within the Borough
Grouped by conurbation clockwise from the north:
 Banstead, Burgh Heath and Nork 
 Kingswood including Lower Kingswood
 Chipstead and Woodmansterne Park
 Hooley and Netherne-on-the-Hill
 Redhill, Earlswood, Meadvale Merstham, Whitebushes/South Earlswood and Salfords 
 Horley
 Sidlow
 Reigate, Gatton, South Park, Flanchford/Skimmington/Wonham Mill (hamlets) and Woodhatch
 Walton-on-the-Hill and Mogador/Margery (hamlets)
 Tadworth, The Tattenhams (Tattenham Grove, Heath & Corner)
 Epsom Downs (part of) The developed part of Epsom Downs is not in Epsom and Ewell and is near Epsom Downs railway station

Elevations, Landscape and Wildlife
The northern third of the borough is on the North Downs or its upper slopes. Commanding viewpoints exist in several locations in this area with the southern aspects of Colley Hill and Reigate Hill noteworthy enough to have had a major memorial and a picnic area with large café respectively. Historically much of this third was named Walton Heath and Banstead Heath.

The softer Greensand Ridge which is parallel to the south breaks up in the middle of the borough, forming the Redhill basin and various mounds around Reigate before continuing in both directions at higher elevations, see the Greensand Way.  The Mole forms a section of the western border of the borough down to Wonham Mill at the western extreme of Flanchford in the Reigate post town, itself at a millpond at the foot of the wooded Snag Brook a tributary which rises near the A25 Dorking Road.  Most of the county is Metropolitan Green Belt.

There are significant areas of forest and heath management, including five reserves within the national wildlife trust scheme: see Surrey Wildlife Trust.

Economy
The economy is diverse, with a strong local service sector, city workers as most locations are easily within the London Commuter Belt, trades, a developed public/education sector and several farms concentrated towards cereal and root vegetable agriculture.  There is an extent of woodland management. Several employers with an international renown are found in force in and around the two most commercial towns centres of Reigate and Redhill: including Willis Towers Watson, Just, Kimberly Clark, Travelers Group (insurance), AXA Insurance breakdown, Black & Veatch and Esure. Pfizer UK headquarters is by the M25 motorway in Walton-on-the-Hill. Notably Sutton and East Surrey Water is headquartered in Redhill and SGN in Horley.  A choice of hotels exists in and around Horley including its adjacent neighbourhood, sometimes named independently by businesses and residents, Hookwood, on the east and north outskirts of London Gatwick Airport respectively.

Historic Airline Companies based in the borough
In the late 20th century the airline Dan-Air had its head office in the Newman House in Horley, and Air Europe had its head office in Reigate.

Transport

Roads
The M25 motorway passes from the middle of the east of the borough to just south of the tripoint with Epsom and Ewell and Mole Valley and has two junctions, one for the M23 motorway that passes through the eastern side of the borough north–south and starts in the northeast of the borough, the other at Reigate Hill.  The A23 road from London splits into the ongoing A23 from the south and the M23 at Hooley.

The A217 road is a second London road starting in Reigate via Banstead and Sutton and on to London.  Two traditional, mostly up to county distance alternatives inspired the names of the north–south/east-west motorway: the low A25  between Godstone/Guildford and the A23, the latter being used for the London to Brighton events.

Rail
The main train operator in the borough is Southern, with other services being operated by Thameslink and Great Western Railway. Through routes are the North Downs Line and the more heavily used London to Brighton line that has several operators plus several branch service routes operating to London (the destination in the borough of one such service is Reigate). Although these are the main railways for long and short-distance travel, two branch lines cut through lower parts of the North Downs plateau in the north (to Tattenham Corner via Kingswood and to Epsom Downs via Banstead, all four stations being in the borough).

Twinning
The borough is twinned with:
 Brunoy in Essonne, Île-de-France, France
 Eschweiler in North Rhine-Westphalia, Germany

Freedom of the Borough
The following people and military units have received the Freedom of the Borough of Reigate and Banstead.

Individuals
 Dr. Michael "Mike" Ormerod: 2007.

See also

List of places of worship in Reigate and Banstead
Reigate Town Hall

Notes and references

Notes
  
References

External links
 Reigate and Banstead Borough Council
 The Reigate Web

 
Non-metropolitan districts of Surrey
Coast to Capital Local Enterprise Partnership
Reigate
Boroughs in England